Peter Enzinger (born 23 January 1916, date of death unknown) was an Austrian wrestler. He competed in the men's Greco-Roman light heavyweight at the 1948 Summer Olympics.

References

External links
 

1916 births
Year of death missing
Austrian male sport wrestlers
Olympic wrestlers of Austria
Wrestlers at the 1948 Summer Olympics
Place of birth missing